Ceiba Doblada Airport  is an airstrip serving the village of Ceiba Doblada in Usulután Department, El Salvador.

See also

Transport in El Salvador
List of airports in El Salvador

References

External links
 OurAirports - Ceiba Doblada Airport
 OpenStreetMap - Ceiba Doblada

Airports in El Salvador